Colony Park Football Club are a Scottish football club from the town of Inverurie, Aberdeenshire. Colony Park F.C. was established in 1978 by five local Inverurie men, Dod Reid, Wattie Strachan, Bob Gibb, Frank Heldreth and George Mitchell.  They are the largest Juvenile football club in North-East Scotland, running teams from under-7 through to under-19 level. In 2011, they successfully applied for membership of the Scottish Junior Football Association, and joined North Region, Division Two for the 2011–12 season. The club also successfully applied for membership of the Scottish Amateur Football Association, and joined Aberdeenshire Amateur Football Association in Division Three. This has allowed former youth players to continue with the club and bridged a gap between age group football and the Highland League.

Former Colony players include Barry Robson and Darren Mackie.

The Colony Park facility after which the club is named, was opened in 1977 and until 1999 was the home of Inverurie Juniors, the town's previous Junior side.

Colony lifted their first honour in the Junior game by winning the 2015–16 North Division One (East) championship, completing the league season undefeated. The club won 19 of their 22 matches and their final day fixture at home to Longside was watched by a crowd of 1,356.

The club also had an amateur team, Colony Park Amateurs Football Club, which started in the 2015–2016 season. They played in the East Section of Division 1, ground-sharing with the Juniors and played their home fixtures at Colony Park on Harlaw Road. The Amateurs were managed by Dave Mitchell, Greig Watson, Craig Simpson and Craig McFarlane. The 2018–2019 season was a record season for “The Ams” as they won their first ever trophy, the Barclay Cook Cup, in a thrilling final against local rivals Kintore. They shortly completed the double by winning the Division 2 East league undefeated, finishing with 26 wins and 2 draws in their 28-game campaign.

Honours
North Region First Division (East) winners: 2015–16
Domino's Pizza Cup Runners Up: 2016-17

References

External links 

 Club website
 Scottish Football Historical Archive

Football in Aberdeenshire
Football clubs in Scotland
Scottish Junior Football Association clubs
Association football clubs established in 1978
1978 establishments in Scotland
Inverurie